Kushboo Ramnawaj (born March 23, 1990) is a Mauritian beauty pageant titleholder who was crowned Miss Mauritius 2014, and had to represent her country at the Miss Universe 2015 pageant but due to personal reasons, she withdrew her participation in December. However, in 2016 she competed at Miss Universe 2016.

Pageantry

Miss Mauritius 2014
Kushboo was crowned as Miss Mauritius 2014 represented Rivière Du Poste on June 28, 2014 at the Johnson & Johnson Auditorium in Vacoas-Phoenix. At the same event, the Runners-up of Miss Mauritius were crowned as Miss World Mauritius and Miss International Mauritius and represented Mauritius at 2015 International pageants.

Miss Universe 2016
On her 26th birthday, Kushboo was asked by the National Director of Miss Universe Mauritius, Nevin Rupear, if she could represent Mauritius at Miss Universe 2016, Kushboo affirmed with the statement and she was soon appointed as Miss Universe Mauritius 2016 wherein she represented Mauritius at the Miss Universe 2016 pageant but Unplaced.

Awards
Miss Mauritius 2014 - Won

Miss Beach Beauty 2014 - Won

Miss Elegance 2014 - 2nd Runner Up

Miss Savanne 2014 - 1st Runner Up

References

External links
Official Miss Mauritius website

1990 births
Living people
People from Port Louis District
Mauritian beauty pageant winners
Mauritian people of Indian descent
Mauritian Hindus
Mauritian female models
Female models of Indian descent
Miss Universe 2016 contestants
University of Mauritius alumni